Claypool, West Virginia may refer to the following communities in West Virginia:
Claypool, Logan County, West Virginia
Claypool, Summers County, West Virginia